Hoo Hey How ("Fish-Prawn-Crab") is a Chinese dice-game. It is related to Bầu cua cá cọp in Vietnam, Klah Klok/kla klouk in Cambodia, and similar to Crown and Anchor in the West Indies and the American game chuck-a-luck.

References 

Dice games
Chinese games